George Bruce Upton (October 11, 1804 – July 1, 1874) was an American shipbuilder and politician who served in the Massachusetts House of Representatives, the Massachusetts Senate and the Massachusetts Executive Council.

Early life
Upton was born on October 11, 1804, to Daniel Putnam Upton and Hannah (Bruce) Upton in Eastport, Maine (then a part of Massachusetts).

Family life
Upton married Ann Coffin Hussey of Nantucket on May 2, 1826.  They had eight children.

Business career
Upton served as the treasurer of the Michigan Central Railroad for eight years.

Public service
While he lived in Nantucket Upton was a member of the  Massachusetts House of Representatives in 1837, and a member of the Massachusetts Senate in 1843.  After he moved back to Boston Upton served as a member of the Massachusetts Executive Council in 1853, and as a member of the Massachusetts Constitutional Convention of 1853.

Whig National Convention
Upton served as delegate to the Whig National Convention in 1844.

References

1804 births
Members of the Massachusetts House of Representatives
Massachusetts state senators
Massachusetts Whigs
19th-century American politicians
People from Eastport, Maine
Politicians from Boston
People from Nantucket, Massachusetts
Members of the Massachusetts Governor's Council
1844 United States presidential electors
Whig National Conventions
1874 deaths
Businesspeople from Boston
19th-century American businesspeople